William Maurice may refer to:
Sir William Maurice (politician), Welsh politician
William Maurice, Prince of Nassau-Siegen
William Maurice (antiquary) (1620–1680)
William Maurice (pirate), first man to be hanged, drawn and quartered in England in 1241
William Maurice, Count of Isenburg-Büdingen-Birstein, see Prince Franz Adolph of Anhalt-Bernburg-Schaumburg-Hoym

See also

William Morice (disambiguation)
William Morris (disambiguation)